Carolina Baumgartner (born 1 November 1989) is a Brazilian model, best known for winning the Miss Brazil USA 2010.

Biography 

Carol Baumgartner was born in Brusque, Santa Catarina in Southern Brazil. Her parents Nadia Kock Baumgartner a housewife and Gabriel Baumgartner, a manager are both of German descent. She has an older sister Gabriela and two younger brothers David and Andre.

Career 

Her modeling career began at the age of 14. In 2007, Carol began her studies in Journalism in her home country. Later in 2009 she moved to New York City to take part of an exchange program providing the opportunity to learn American culture. Carol has modeled continually since her arrival in New York. She has worked for various companies and walked in a number of fashion shows. She is passionate about music, healthy living, cooking, song writing, and traveling. In 2014 she got certified as a holistic nutritionist and wants to help young people deal with their eating struggles.

Miss Brasil USA

Carol took part in the Miss Brasil USA Pageant which was held on November 20, 2010, at Newark Symphony Hall, in New Jersey. She won the title beating out over 46 other Brazilian contestants coming from all over the United States.

References

 https://web.archive.org/web/20141129172529/http://www.jornal.us/article-5297.Final-do-Miss-Brasil-USA-termina-coroando-Carol-Baumgartner-como-MISS-BRASIL-USA-2010.html
 https://web.archive.org/web/20110706150653/http://www.adjorisc.com.br/jornais/obarrigaverde/variedades/carol-baumgartner-e-eleita-miss-brasil-usa-2010-1.375848
 https://web.archive.org/web/20110708092412/http://www.brazilianvoice.com/bv_noticias/bv_comunidade/40669-Carol-Baumgartner-eleita-Miss-Brasil-USA-2010.html
 http://mundomiss.blogspot.com/2010/11/final-do-miss-brasil-usa-termina.html
 http://braziliantimes.com/noticia/4006,comunidade_brasileira,MISS+BRASIL+USA+QUER+USAR+TA%C2%ADTULO+PARA+AJUDAR+BRASILEIROS.html
 http://www.clicrbs.com.br/diariocatarinense/jsp/default.jsp?uf=2&local=18&section=Geral&newsID=a3120933.htm
 https://web.archive.org/web/20110706160204/http://www.montecastelo.sc.gov.br/gerais/633/catarinense-e-eleita-miss-brasil-usa-2010.php
 http://braziliantimes.com/noticia/3977,comunidade_brasileira,MISS+BRASIL+USA+2010+E+CONHECIDA+SOB+GLAMOUR+E+EMOCAO.html
 https://web.archive.org/web/20110706160654/http://www.88.9fm.net.br/?pag=noticia_exibir&cod=191
 http://frutilau.com/2010/11/22/brusquense-e-coroada-miss-brasil-usa-2010/
 http://content.yudu.com/Library/A1q2y7/24horas360826deNovem/resources/4.htm
 http://vittrinne.com.br/tijucas/noticias/39-santa-catarinha/453-catarinense-e-eleita-miss-brasil-usa-2010.html
 https://web.archive.org/web/20110708092656/http://www.brazilianpress.com/20110120/social_edilton_ny/edilton_ny.htm
 https://web.archive.org/web/20110706152514/http://www.galeramix.com.br/noticias/detalhe/catarinense-e-eleita-miss-brasil-usa-2010
 https://web.archive.org/web/20110710170713/http://www.ediltonsantos.com/inc/coluna.php?id=517&lng=pt
 http://www.clicrbs.com.br/jsc/sc/impressa/4,1147,3128903,16020

External links

 Official WebSite
 
 Lifestyle Project

1989 births
Living people
People from Brusque, Santa Catarina
Brazilian people of German descent
Brazilian female models
Brazilian expatriates in the United States
Brazilian models of German descent